The Pacific Repertory Theatre is a non-profit California corporation, based in Carmel-by-the-Sea, California, that produces theatrical productions and events, including the annual Carmel Shakespeare Festival. It is one of eight major arts institutions in Monterey County, as designated by the Community Foundation of Monterey County, and is supported in part by grants from the David and Lucile Packard Foundation, The Shubert Foundation, the Berkshire Foundation and the Monterey Peninsula Foundation.

History 
The company was founded in 1982 as GroveMont Theatre by Carmel-by-the-Sea resident Stephen Moorer, who served as its artistic director from 1983 to 2008, and its Executive Director since 2009. The organizational name changed to Pacific Repertory Theatre in 1994 when the company acquired the historic site of the Golden Bough Playhouse in downtown Carmel, and announced plans to establish a professional theatre for the region. In 2001, in order to facilitate an appearance by Olympia Dukakis and Louis Zorich in Chekhov's The Cherry Orchard, the company entered into a seasonal agreement with Actors' Equity Association. It thereby became the only professional theatre in Monterey County.

The company gained wider attention for its series of Shakespeare plays entitled Royal Blood: The Rise and Fall of Kings. Over the course of several summers beginning in 2001, it presented all of Shakespeare's histories in chronological order.

PacRep presents a year-round season of 10–12 plays and musicals in three historic Carmel theatres: The 300-seat Golden Bough Playhouse, the 120-seat Circle Theatre, and the 540-seat outdoor Forest Theater. The company presents over 175 performances each year.

Forest Theater 
In 1984, Pacific Repertory Theatre joined the Forest Theater community.  At the request of the Carmel Cultural Commission, the company began producing shows at the historic outdoor facility, staging Robinson Jeffers’ Medea, starring local actress Rosamond Goodrich Zanides. In 1990, the company reactivated the old Carmel Shake-speare Festival of the 1940s, playing in repertory at the Forest, Golden Bough, and Circle theatres, and adding the hyphen in "Shake-speare" to denote interest and support research into the growing Shakespeare Authorship Question. Since that time, the company has continued to stage productions at the Forest Theater every September and October, expanding into August in 2000, when it became the only professional theater company in residence at the Forest Theater. In 2011, following the closure of the 50-year-old Children's Experimental Theater, the City of Carmel awarded the year-round lease of the indoor Forest Theater to PacRep for its educational SoDA program.

Leadership change 
In 2008, the PacRep Board of Directors named Kenneth Kelleher as Artistic Director, and founder Stephen Moorer was named Executive Director after serving as Artistic Director since 1982. Kelleher has been a theatre director in the San Francisco Bay area for many years, including at the San Francisco Shakespeare Festival and Shakespeare at Stinson. The 2009 season marked the first full season under Kelleher's artistic leadership. The season included a 14-member adaptation of Man of La Mancha, and the controversial David Hare play, The Blue Room, a frank look at sexual encounters based on La Ronde. Both productions were directed by Kelleher, who also assumed directorial duties for the season productions of Hamlet and As You Like It.

Outreach 
Annual outreach programs include PacRep's School of Dramatic Arts (SoDA) and the Tix4Kids program that distributes subsidized theatre tickets to underserved youth. In addition, the company regularly participates in numerous community activities including regional parade, festivals and holiday events.

References 
Notes

External links 
 

Regional theatre in the United States
California Historical Landmarks
Performing arts centers in California
Theatres in California
Theatre companies in California
Carmel-by-the-Sea, California
1983 establishments in California
Tourist attractions in Monterey County, California
Buildings and structures in Monterey County, California
Theatres completed in 1952
Shakespeare festivals in the United States
Shakespeare authorship question